Surendra Verma (born 7 September 1941) is a leading Hindi litterateur and playwright. He started out as a playwright, when his play Surya Ki Antim Kiran Se Surya Ki Pahli Kiran Tak (From sunset to sunrise, 1972) became quite well known; it has been translated into six Indian languages.  He has had a long association with the National School of Drama.and has published about fifteen titles of short stories, satires, novels and plays.

He has won the Sangeet Natak Akademi Award in 1993 and the Sahitya Akademi Award in 1996 vyas samman in 2016.

Early life and education

Born in Jhansi, he is an M.A. in linguistics. He has 4 brothers and a sister. One of his brothers, Ravindra Verma, also writes. So does his sister-in-law.

Career
He started his career as a teacher and soon started writing stories. His first play, Surya ki antim kiran sesurya kipahli kiran tak (From the Sun's Last Ray to the Sun's First Ray`) was premiered in Marathi by Amol Palekar in 1972.

Nind Kyon Rat Bhar Nahin Ati (`Why Doesn't Sleep Stay the Whole Night) published in 1976, anthologizes his short plays. Qaid-e-Hayat talks about the personal life of poet Mirza Ghalib, including his  financial hardships and his tragic love for Katiba, a woman calligraphist, who was working on his diwan.

Works

Novels
 Do Murdon Ke Liye Guldasta (2000)
 Mujhe Chand Chahiye (1993)- Won Sahitya Academy Award
 "Katna Shami Ka Vriksha Padmapankhuri Ki Dhar Se"(2010)

Plays
 Surya Ki Antim Kiran Se Surya Ki Pahli Kiran Tak (From Sunset to Sunrise, 1972)
 Athwan sarg (Eighth Chapter), 1976,
 Chhote Saiyad bade Saiyad (Junior Saiyad and Senior Saiyad), 1978
 Qaid-e-hayat (Imprisonment of Life), 1983
 "Rati Ka Kangan," 2011
The play Surya ki antim kiran se...  was translated as From sunset to sunrise by Jaya Krishnamachari.
 "Dropadi"
 "shakuntala ki anguthi"  
English playyyy "Shakespeare In Love With the Mughal Princess Jahan Ara" and it's Urdu version "Shakespeare Giraftaar Princess Jahan Ara Ke Pyyaar Mein"

Kannada translations

Plays 

 Suraystadinda Suryodayadavarige by Siddhaling Pattanshetti (1979, 1981, 2017) (Surya Ki Antim Kiran Se Surya Ki Pahli Kiran Tak (From Sunset to Sunrise, 1972))

Awards and recognition
He is also noted as a novelist and won the Sahitya Akademi Award 1996 for his novel Mujhe Chand Chahiye (I want the moon), given by Sahitya Akademi, India's National Academy of Letters. Also the recipient of Sangeet Natak Akademi Award, 1992 for Playwright in Hindi, given by Sangeet Natak Akademi, India's National Academy of Music Dance and Drama.

Adaptations 
His historical play, Surya Ki Antim Kiran Se Surya Ki Pahli Kiran Tak, about female sexuality, man-woman relationships, gender equality, has been staged by numerous theatre directors. National School of Drama Repertory Company presented it for the first time in 1974. Amol Palekar who had already directed his stage version in 1972, later was adapted it into Marathi film Anahat (2003).

Chhote Saiyad bade Saiyad (Junior Saiyad and Senior Saiyad) (1978) was directed by B. V. Karanth in 1980, and Qaid-e-hayat (Imprisonment of Life) (1983) was directed by Ram Gopal Bajaj in 1989 at the National School of Drama.

References

 

Indian male dramatists and playwrights
1941 births
Living people
People from Jhansi
Hindi dramatists and playwrights
Recipients of the Sahitya Akademi Award in Hindi
Recipients of the Sangeet Natak Akademi Award
Hindi-language writers
Indian male novelists
20th-century Indian dramatists and playwrights
Dramatists and playwrights from Uttar Pradesh
20th-century Indian novelists
Novelists from Uttar Pradesh
20th-century Indian male writers